Arthur Silva may refer to:

 Arthur Silva White (1859-1932), British geographer and travel author
 Arthur Marcelles de Silva (1879-1957), Ceylonese surgeon
 Artur da Costa e Silva (1899-1969), Brazilian army marshall and former President of Brazil
 Arthur Silva (footballer, born 1990), Brazilian football centre-back
 Arthur Silva (footballer, born 1995), Brazilian football defensive midfielder
 Arthur D. Silva Water Tank, water tank in Shoshone, Idaho

See also
Arthur Silver